Tiziano Annoni (born 20 August 1955) is an Italian sprint canoer who competed in the mid-1970s. At the 1976 Summer Olympics in Montreal, he was eliminated in the repechages of the C-2 500 m and the semifinals of the C-2 1000 m event.

References
Sports-reference.com profile

1955 births
Canoeists at the 1976 Summer Olympics
Italian male canoeists
Living people
Olympic canoeists of Italy
20th-century Italian people